USS Dart may refer to the following ships of the United States Navy: 

 , a small schooner captured on 4 July 1861 during the American Civil War
 , a ferry launch in service from 1900 to 1930

United States Navy ship names